Paul Merton's Birth of Hollywood is a 2011 BBC documentary series written, directed and presented by Paul Merton. The three-part series traces the rise of the American film-making industry in Hollywood through from the early years of film-making to the foundation of the major motion-picture studios and the new class of the film star.

Episodes

References

External links

BBC television documentaries
2011 British television series debuts